Bredenbek is a municipality of Schleswig-Holstein, Germany.

Bredenbek may also stand for:
Bredenbek (Alster), a  river of Schleswig-Holstein and Hamburg, Germany, tributary of the Alster
Bredenbek (Bünzau),  a  river of Schleswig-Holstein, Germany, tributary of the Bünzau